Monica Dejesus-Anaya, known by the stage persona Monica Beverly Hillz, is an American reality television personality and transgender activist, originally known for appearing on season 5 of RuPaul's Drag Race. She was the second contestant in the show's history to come out as a transgender woman on the show, after Sonique in season 2 (who came out during the show's reunion special). Hillz coming out was historic as it was a first for network television. 

In 2014, she was selected as one of the Windy City Times "30 Under 30" for the "best LGBTQIA activism, business, culture, non-profit work and more" as well as Bustle naming her one of the "most popular" RPDR alum. In 2015, she performed at the MTV Video Music Awards with Miley Cyrus for her live performance of "Dooo It!", along with other well known drag queens and RPDR alum.

Biography

Dejesus-Anaya is of Puerto Rican descent. After the age of four, she was raised by her maternal aunt Gladys in Chicago's Latino Northwest Side. While in school, she was the victim of physical bullying, with other students kicking, punching, and slapping her. Due to the bullying, she attempted suicide as a sophomore and dropped out of school. Gladys died when Dejesus-Anaya was 15, leaving five children behind. At that point, Dejesus-Anaya moved back in with her mother. In Chicago, Dejesus-Anaya started performing at Latino gay clubs before deciding to move back to Kentucky, where she became a performer at Owensboro's only gay bar. She struggled with poverty, compounding issues she faced while as an adolescent and young adult.

At age 17, Dejesus-Anaya attended her first drag show, stating she "loved it." After deciding to perform in drag herself, Dejesus-Anaya chose the name 'Monica', a tribute to Bollywood actress Monica and then Beverly Hills, the city in Los Angeles County, where she wanted to live. Dejesus-Anaya considers her look in drag to be a mix of Aaliyah and Faith Evans, and her look while presenting as a male to resemble singer Bruno Mars. She is inspired by Carmen Carrera, Amanda Lepore, Calpernia Addams, and Maria Roman.

While living in Kentucky, Dejesus-Anaya worked at Macy's for a year and nine months, where she experienced discrimination from certain individuals. In Illinois, she worked as an escort while using narcotics, during which time she stated she was robbed and sexually assaulted. Due to the experiences while working as an escort, she has sleeping issues and nightmares.

Career

RuPaul's Drag Race
In 2013, Dejesus-Anaya was a contestant on the fifth season of the American television reality competition RuPaul's Drag Race. Previously, she had auditioned for season 1 and season 3. During the show, it was widely commented that she seemed "excessively distracted". The reason became clear when during the show she came out as transgender during the elimination portion of episode 2 in which she fell into the bottom two. Speaking to the judges, she stated, "I feel I'm not here. I've just been holding a secret in and trying so hard. I'm not just a drag queen – I'm a transgendered woman." The producers have stated that the reveal was not a contrived part of the show; they found out about her identifying as transgender during the filming of the episode. Guest judges Kristen Johnston and Juliette Lewis both responded with supportive statements. As producer Tom Campbell stated, "We discovered at the same time as everyone else. It was not revealed at any time during the casting process and everyone learned about it at the same time." Fellow competitor and eventual season winner Jinkx Monsoon called Dejesus-Anaya her "hero" during the announcement.

While distracted, Dejesus-Anaya did well in week 1. RuPaul commented that Dejesus-Anaya looked like Lady Miss Kier, with L'Etoile Magazine calling her face "fabulous". In week 2, she fell into the bottom two against Serena ChaCha, with the two of them lipsyncing to Rihanna's "Only Girl in the World". Dejesus-Anaya won the lipsync battle, with Serena ChaCha being sent home. The following week, Dejesus-Anaya was the third contestant eliminated on the show when she again fell into the bottom two and competed against contestant Coco Montrese.

Post-RuPaul's Drag Race
Dejesus-Anaya joined the Chicago-based gay Feast of Fun podcast in 2013.

In December 2014, Dejesus-Anaya was one of the subjects of a photo series called WERKS, shot by Nestor Photography. The show was held at Chicago designer Michelle Tan's boutique Michelle Tan Clothing. Other drag queens featured in the series included RPDR alum Gia Gunn (season 6), Dida Ritz (season 4), and Jade Jolie (season 5).

In 2015, Dejesus-Anaya joined other drag queens to film the music video for singer Glenn Stewart's cover of "(Here it Comes) Around Again", originally performed by RuPaul. Other drag queens who joined for the video included RPDR alum JujuBee (season 2), Kelly Mantle (season 6), Jade Sotomayor (season 1),  Jade Jolie (season 5), Joslyn Fox (season 6), and Jaidynn Diore Fierce (season 7). In 2015, Puerto Rican gay scholar Lawrence La Fountain-Stokes presented a talk titled "The Drag of Poverty" in which he discussed Dejesus-Anaya's experiences in relation to those of other Puerto Rican performers, namely Erika Lopez and Holly Woodlawn. The talk is part of a book project La Fountain-Stokes is working on called Translocas: Trans Diasporic Puerto Rican Drag.

Dejesus-Anaya has continued to perform and make appearances up through 2015, including RuPaul's first Drag Con, held May 16–17, 2015, at the Los Angeles Convention Center.

Activism
In 2013, American actress Amanda Bynes insulted RuPaul on Twitter, tweeting, "My dad is as ugly as RuPaul! So thankful I look nothing like you both! I had nose surgery after my mug shots so my nose and I are gorgeous!" Dejesus-Anaya came to RuPaul's defense, telling Bynes to "clean herself up" and "get a better wig".

In 2014, Dejesus-Anaya and Carmen Carrera, another trans former RPDR contestant, both spoke out against the perceived transphobic language that was included on RPDR. The phrases included "she-male" and "tranny", which Dejesus-Anaya stated "were not cute at all."

When unconfirmed rumors began circulating that Caitlyn Jenner was undergoing a gender transition In Touch Weekly released a cover with a male-presenting Caitlyn (then known as Bruce) in photoshopped makeup. The cover was widely criticized, and Dejesus-Anaya released a statement saying "I think it's so wrong in so many ways for them to poke fun and do such things to someone... They know nothing about just to make money and make a mockery of trans people everywhere. They need to educate instead of just doing nonsense like that."

Filmography

Web series

References

External links
Instagram page

1985 births
Living people
American drag queens
American people of Puerto Rican descent
Female models from Kentucky
Hispanic and Latino American drag queens
Hispanic and Latino American female models
Hispanic and Latino American women
Activists from Kentucky
LGBT Hispanic and Latino American people
People from Chicago
People from Owensboro, Kentucky
Monica Beverly Hillz
Transgender female models
Transgender drag performers
LGBT people from Illinois
LGBT people from Kentucky